Mimosa townsendii is a species of plant in the family Fabaceae. It is found only in Ecuador. Its natural habitat is subtropical or tropical dry shrubland.

References

townsendii
Flora of Ecuador
Endangered plants
Taxonomy articles created by Polbot